KPXH-LD, virtual channel 52 and UHF digital channel 16, is a low-powered Daystar owned-and-operated television station licensed to Fort Collins, Colorado. The station is owned by the Word of God Fellowship.

External links
 RabbitEars TV Query for KPXH-LD

PXH-LD
Television channels and stations established in 1988
1988 establishments in Colorado
Low-power television stations in the United States